Peach Pit is an indie pop band from Vancouver, British Columbia, Canada. The band consists of singer and rhythm guitarist Neil Smith, lead guitarist Christopher Vanderkooy, bassist Peter Wilton, and drummer Mikey Pascuzzi. Lately they have been joined by multi-instrumentalist Dougal Bain McLean on synth, guitar, and fiddle. They describe their own music as "chewed bubblegum pop", whereas critics have described their sound as sad pop, and surf rock and is characterized by a soft spoken vocal style and guitar-driven rock melodies. The band's music videos are produced by videographer Lester Lyons-Hookham. The band sported the same clothes for every live performance during their "Being So Normal" album phase after buying them for their first music video shoot.

History 
The group formed when high school friends, Neil Smith and Chris Vanderkooy, decided to collaborate on a musical project in 2014. Peter Wilton and Mikey Pascuzzi joined them on bass and drums. In June 2016, the band released its debut EP, Sweet FA, produced and recorded by Smith's former roommate Harley Small at The Space Studios in Vancouver BC. They quickly began work on their follow up release and debut LP, Being So Normal. The album was again produced and recorded by Harley Small at The Space Studios and was released in September 2017 on the Vancouver indie label Kingfisher Bluez.'

Vocalist/rhythm guitarist Neil Smith was formerly part of the folk band Dogwood and Dahlia. Smith and bassist Peter Wilton formerly worked as Amazon delivery drivers, guitarist Christopher Vanderkooy worked at a local Vancouver brewery, and drummer Mikey Pascuzzi worked as a carpenter. The band quit their jobs to go on their first tour of North America, Europe and Asia from 2017 to 2018. They have been touring steadily ever since the release of their debut album.

Peach Pit performed at Bonnaroo, Shaky Knees Music Festival, CBC Music Festival, and Capitol Hill Block Party in 2019 and opened for Two Door Cinema Club in a tour of the U.S. and Canada in 2019. You and Your Friends is their second album and was released on April 3, 2020. Their third studio album, From 2 to 3, was released on March 4, 2022.

Members 

 Neil Smith — lead vocals, rhythm guitar
 Christopher Vanderkooy — lead guitar, lap steel guitar, keyboards
 Peter Wilton — bass guitar, backup vocals
 Mikey Pascuzzi — drums, percussion, harmonica

Discography

Albums

EPs 

Sweet FA (2016)

Live albums 

Peach Pit on Audiotree Live (2017)

Singles 

 Alrighty Aphrodite (September 12, 2017) appeared on Billboard Canada Rock chart for 15 weeks, peaking at #37

 Did I Make You Cry on Christmas Day? (Well, You Deserved It!) (December 14, 2017)

 Feelin' Low (F*ckboy Blues) (November 1, 2019)

 Shampoo Bottles (January 24, 2020)

 Black Licorice (March 5, 2020)

 Up Granville (October 1, 2021)

 Look Out! (November 12, 2021) includes Up Granville and Look Out!

 Vickie (January 21, 2022) includes Up Granville and Look Out!

References 

2016 establishments in British Columbia
Canadian indie pop groups
Canadian indie rock groups
Musical groups established in 2016
Musical groups from Vancouver